'''Police Football Club can refer to

 Al-Shorta SC, Iraq
 Ansan Police FC, South Korea
 Ho Chi Minh City Police F.C., Vietnam
 Home United FC, Singapore
 Konkola Mine Police F.C., Chililabombwe, Zambia
 Metropolitan Police F.C., Surrey, England
 NYPD FC, New York City, United States
 Police A.F.C., Isle of Man
 Police F.C. (Guyana)
 Police F.C. (Rwanda)
 Police FC (Trinidad and Tobago)
 Police FC (Uganda)
 Police Sports Club (Grenada), Grenada
 PSNI F.C., Police Service of Northern Ireland Football Club
 Somali Police FC, Horsed, Somalia
 West Midlands Police F.C., Birmingham, England

See also
AS Police (disambiguation)
Kyoto Prefectural Police S.C., Japan